Abdol Rezaabad (also Romanized as ‘Abdol Reẕāābād and ‘Abd or Reẕāābād; also known as Qarah Qābākh and Qarah Qābākh-e Ḩasan Khānlū) is a village in Savalan Rural District, in the Central District of Parsabad County, Ardabil Province, Iran. At the 2006 census, its population was 840, in 173 families.

References 

Towns and villages in Parsabad County